Bretagne (c. September 1999 – June 6, 2016) was a Golden Retriever rescue dog who searched for survivors at Ground Zero after the September 11 attacks. It was the first assignment for her and her owner and trainer, Denise Corliss, and they worked there for 10 days.  Corliss, a volunteer firefighter with the Cy-Fair Fire Department, began training Bretagne for search and rescue work at just eight weeks old.

She appeared on the Today Show along with  NBC News’ Tom Brokaw. She later participated in rescue efforts after Hurricanes Rita, Katrina and Ivan.  She was retired at the age of 9. After her retirement, she continued her community service as a reading dog at a local elementary school. First grade students who were shy about reading aloud were more willing when Bretagne was there lending a friendly listening ear. 

She is believed to have been the last surviving dog from the 9/11 attacks when she was euthanized in Texas in 2016; she was 16 years old and suffering from kidney failure.   As Bretagne entered the animal hospital in Cypress, Texas, firefighters and search and rescue workers from the fire department lined the sidewalk and saluted. She was carried out later, her body draped in an American flag.

Pronunciation 
Bretagne's name is pronounced "Brittany."

See also
 Jake (rescue dog), another 9/11 search dog
 List of individual dogs

References

1999 animal births
2016 animal deaths
Animal deaths by euthanasia
Individual dogs
Search and rescue dogs
Aftermath of the September 11 attacks
Hurricane Katrina